RATBV S.A., formerly Regia Autonomă de Transport Brașov, and commonly referred to as RAT Brașov, is the only public transport operator in the city of Brașov, Romania. It is owned by the Brașov Municipality and it operates on a network of 43 routes inside Brașov, summing up to 664 km, with a fleet of over 225 vehicles. It is also operating 19 routes within the Brașov Metropolitan Area.

History 
The following is a chronological list of events related to road or rail transport in and around Brașov, as well as relevant historical information.

The administrative divisions and predominant/official languages consistently change over time; in Saxon cities and villages like Braşov, German was predominant until the late 19th and early 20th centuries, when Romanian and for a few decades, Hungarian, increase in use, ultimately attaining a combined 95.2% in 2011. Except for 'Brașov', the names used are intended to be the ones most common in their day.

Beginnings 

 1830-1840: The first intra-city means of public transportation appear in Brașov - hackneys and carriages with one or two horses, built by Saxon craftsmen. They regularly waited for customers in Marktplatz and could carry 1-4 persons with luggage, towards the other three areas of town: Blumenau, Altstadt, Şchei.
 1846-1866: Drumul Braşovului (the Brașov Road), between Câmpina, Wallachia and Brașov, is built. Today, it is part of DN1.
 1848: First intercity public transport across the Carpathians is made available by the local Franz Körner, who sets up a fast carriage route between Brașov and București.
 1856-1859: Körner opens another line, Braşov-București-Giurgiu, which operated weekly and could carry 8-10 people with luggage.
 1864-1867: The road from Braşov to Reps is built.
 1890-1895: The first lines using the famous Landau carriages open up. They left daily for Siebendörfer, Zuisendorf and Törzburg for the price of 5 Austro-Hungarian florins.
 1892-1900: On 7 March 1892, the first suburban railway of current-day Romania was opened between Bartholomew and Siebendörfer. 17 km long, it connected the city to the seven villages that now constitute the town of Săcele. Built with private funds between 1890–1892, by the Brașov-Háromszék Neighboring Railways Society, it functioned until 1960, when, following road infrastructure modernization, it was discontinued.
 1900-1910: The city's population grew from 36,646 to 41,054 people.
 1900-1920: Popularity of horse-drawn carriages drops dramatically as the suburban train's usage increases. The remaining 115 cabmen could still be found in Marktplatz and at Hotel Krone. Some of the regular routes they would take had fixed prices, while other were settled with the customer.

The first bus 

 1925: The first four buses to be used for urban transport are introduced in the city and leased to the Decei-Blaga company, based in Cluj. They ran on two lines, between Piaţa Unirii–Rail Station (14 stops), and Piaţa Unirii–Bartholomew Rail Station (9 stops).
 1926-1927: The city hall prepares the first Regulations for the circulation of buses in town. In 1926, there were nine bus owners, that obtained the lease for public transport. The Municipal Council limited the number of buses to 30, to avoid traffic accidents. The price of a ticket was 5 lei. Routes were established to Băile Zizin and Băile Vâlcele (three times a week, 20-40 lei/person), leaving from Piaţa Sfatului. Also, two trucks carried people and cargo to and from Bran (25 lei/person, departure times at 15:30 and 6:30 respectively). The carriage drivers from the 'Fulgerul' ('The Lightning') syndicate protested against the expansion of public transportation and asked that the number of buses be limited at 16.
 1928: The prefecture and city police regulate bus circulation furthermore.
 1929: Following complaints from nearby residents, the stop for inter-city connections in Piaţa Sfatului was moved on the corner of Ferdinand Boulevard and Gate St. (next to the current-day rectorship of the University of Transylvania; it currently represents the Livada Poștei stop).
 1930: The Braşov city hall wants to set up its own bus exploitation board and informs the owners that their lease ends on July 1. The Carriage Driver Society of Braşov, in an open letter to the local press, explain that after 100 years of service, the drivers' businesses have gone under, because of the suburban train, the 100 taxis and over 40 buses. They ask the city hall to be awarded the lease over the buses of Mr. Aurel Lazăr Decei (which was about to expire) and limit the number of carriages from 100 to 60.
 1931: The city hall abandons the idea of exploiting the buses by itself, because of the high cost of setting up the board, 25 million lei.
 1938: In association with the city hall, "Regia Întreprinderilor din Municipiul Brașov" (the "Brașov Enterprise Board", "R.I.M.B." for short) is established. Within it, there was a public transportation section, which was equipped with 35 buses serving three routes, summing 17 km: Prund-Astra, Prund-Railway Station and Prund-Bartholomew. They would transport 5.4 million passenger per year.
 1941: Projects were elaborated for the electrification of the Bartolomeu-Satulung suburban railway and for the Center-Astra bus line.
 1944: At this point, R.I.M.B. had 12 buses and transported 3.2 million people.
 1948: The first tracked ZIS-151 truck was introduced on the Prund-Poiana Braşov route (the 'old road'). Overall, the same number of buses, 12, transported 2.6 million people.
 1951: The bus fleet has grown to 33, used on four routes to transport a total of 11 million persons.
 1956: On the Prund-Poiana Braşov route, two trucks were now used (there would be three in 1962, and five in 1963). A total of 51 buses were used on 10 routes summing 56 km. Alongside them, there were 10 taximeters and 64 cargo trucks.

The first trolleybus 

 1959: The board operated 85 buses on 17 routes summing 112 km, and 27 taximeters. On May 1, Braşov became the second city in the country, after București, to operate a trolleybus line. Under the surveillance of Tulcea-born Petru Alexe Bâlbu, the line used a small, 28-seat, slightly dangerous MDT trolley built in the capital (to which another 17 would soon be added). It initially operated on 8 km from Şchei to the MÁV Railway Station, but was later extended to the Triaj area. The electrical rectifying station was built on 3-5 Verii Street.
 1960: The Prund-Tractorul line is opened.
 1961: "Întreprinderea de Transporturi" ("Transportation Enterprise") is established by reorganizing "Întreprinderea de Gospodărie Orășenească" ("City Management Enterprise"). There were 163 buses (83 for intra-city usage, and 80 for external connections), 47 TV2E trolleys, 45 taximeters and 47 cargo trucks.
 1963: The current Livada Poştei-Poiana Braşov road is opened, and several Škoda 706 RTO are added to the fleet.
 1967: The trolleybus base in Sânpetru, capable of maintaining up to 120 trolleys, is opened.
 1970-1975: Several distinctions are awarded by the state for Braşov's public transport system in this period (including 2nd place country-wide in 1972 and 1975). On January 1, 1975, the Transportation Enterprise transfers the 120 buses serving inter-city connections (5 towns and 12 communes) to the newly reorganized "Întreprinderea de Transporturi Auto" (serving the entire Brașov county).
 1978: The Enterprise had a fleet of 600 vehicles serving 50 routes, summing 350 km and transporting 141 million passengers that year. It employed 2.500 people and achieved income worth 117 million lei. The following years, high-capacity buses would be added, as well as Škoda SM-11, Ikarus and IK4, used on tourist routes.
 1979: Construction begins on the new bus and taximeter base capable of maintaining 400 vehicles, along with the Enterprise's new headquarters. Also, this year marks the introduction of autotaxation on all urban routes, as well as a major reorganization and renaming to "Întreprinderea Judeţeană de Transport Local Braşov" ("Braşov County Enterprise for Local Transportation").
 1980:
 On January 1, the fleet (county-wide) was composed of: 317 buses (total capacity 36.584), 190 trolleybuses (total capacity 17.189), 20 taximeters, 43 vans, 136 tipper trucks (total cargo capacity 2.538 tons) and 31 auxiliary vehicles.
 There were 2.575 employees and 489 million lei in funds.
 This year alone, 154.3 million (91 by bus and 63.3 by trolley) people and 4 million tons of cargo were transported.
 136.1 km of overhead wires existed; trolleybus routes summed 83.8 km, and bus routes 275 km in Braşov and 45 in Făgăraş.

 The first tramway 

 1980-1987: Several objectives were achieved:
 The bus and taximeter maintenance base (started in 1979) is finished in 1983. The headquarters is moved to the current address on Hărmanului St no. 49, from the previous 13 Decembrie St no. 17;
 The maintenance spot on Cristianului Road opens in 1984;
 Expansion of the trolleybus network on Griviţei Blvd (2.2 km), in the newly constructed Valea Cetăţii neighbourhood (5.4 km, opened July 15h, 1986) and near Casa Armatei (200 m, opened October 1986);
 Opening on August 22, 1987 of stage I of the first tramway line (named 101), between Steagul Roşu-Rulmentul, on 13.1 km.

 1987:
 The vehicle fleet is composed of a total of 876 vehicles: 182 buses, 209 trolleys, 5 trams, 50 taximeters, 43 vans, 19 trucks, 227 tipper trucks, 5 minibuses, 31 trailers, 58 auxiliary.
 The fleet served one tram and 19 trolley lines, and 16 bus routes in Braşov and 8 in Făgăraş.
 The trolleybus overhead line network summed 77.5 km, trolley routes 229.6 km, and the buses, 340.5 km (of which 247.1 km in Braşov and 93.4 km in Făgăraş).
 There were 2.390 employees, funds of 976 million lei, and revenues of 292 million lei.

 2005-present 

 Description 

 Ticketing system 

Tickets are used by inserting them into the ticket machine on board the bus, a trip is valid for 50 minutes since the ticket is used and can span multiple lines.
Tickets and subscriptions and are occasionally validated by ticket inspectors, the on-the-spot fine for not having a valid ticket is 60 lei.

Ticket types and prices

All subscriptions are nominated, that is they are only valid accompanied by an ID card. Tickets (as well as the monthly 218 lei subscription) are not nominated. The "All lines" notations below do not, in fact, include Line 20 (Poiana Brașov), for which special tickets or subscriptions must be bought.

 Vehicle fleet 

 Current fleet (including retired vehicles) 

Gallery

 Network 

 Current routes 

The columns of the list table below represent:

 Line - The number or name of the route;
 Type - The type of vehicle that the line uses (bus or trolley);
 Opened - The year when the line with this name was operated for the first time, regardless of subsequent route modifications;
 Modified - The last time a modification (adding/subtracting stations, other major changes) occurred;
 Route - A short description of the route, it does not include all the stations;
 Stops - The total number of stops performed in a round trip; this includes the terminal station once;
 Length - The length in kilometres of a round trip;
 Avg. distance - The average distance in metres between two stops;

 Statistics 

Note: "Road used" denotes the distance of the roads on which buses/trolleys travel (it's an approximate value), while "Total route length" is the sum of one round trip of each of the lines implied.

 Discontinued routes 

This table uses the same format as the one above, with two exceptions: the fourth column (Closed) indicates the year when the line (not necessarily the route itself) ceased to operate, and there is an additional column for Notes'''''.

Notes 
Nota bene

References

External links 

  

Companies based in Braşov
Brasov
Brasov